Ahmed Abdul-Hussein (born 22 October 1997) is an Iraqi footballer who plays as a right-back or right-midfielder for Al-Zawraa in the Iraqi Premier League.

International career
On 29 March 2021, Ahmed Abdul-Hussein made his first international cap with Iraq against Uzbekistan in a friendly match in Tashkent that ended with an Iraqi victory 1–0 over the host team.

References

External links 
 
 

1997 births
Living people
Iraqi footballers
Iraq international footballers
Association football defenders